The Rastriya Swatantra Party (RSP) (NIP) is a political party in Nepal. It remained as a junior ally in Prachanda-led government from 26 December 2022 until 5 February 2023. It called back its members from the current coalition government arrangement, however, continued its support to the government becoming a confidence-and-supply partner as of 5 February 2023. 

The party was announced in June 2022 by Rabi Lamichhane. The party was registered with the Election Commission of Nepal on July 1, 2022, ahead of the 2022 Nepalese general election. The RSP is currently the fourth-largest national party in Nepal following the 2022 results.

History 
Rabi Lamichhane resigned as managing director of Galaxy 4K on 16 June 2022 and announced that he would be contesting in the 2022 general elections for a seat at the House of Representatives. On 21 June 2022, he announced the formation of Rastriya Swatantra Party along with a 21-member central committee. The party was formally registered in the Election Commission on 1 July 2022 with Rabi Lamichhane as the founding president and a bell inside a circle as its election symbol.

The party fielded FPTP candidates in 131 constituencies and submitted a closed list of prospective 107 PR lawmakers for seats to the House of Representatives at the 2022 general elections. The party did not field any candidates for provincial assemblies. The party selected candidates through primary elections. The party emerged as the fourth-largest party in the House of Representatives. The party won in seven constituencies; four in Kathmandu, one in Lalitpur and two in Chitwan. It got 10.70% of the party list vote and became one of the seven national parties in the Federal Parliament. The party won an additional 13 seats through the proportional representation system, bringing their total parliamentary strength in the House of Representatives to 20.

Organization 
The party has announced that it will not have any sister organizations and only have members and no cadres. It has also announced that primary elections would be held to select candidates for elections from the party.

Ideology 
The party supports constitutional socialism, participatory democracy, progressivism and political freedom. The party has been described as centre-left, centrist and centre-right by different members within the party.

Policy platform

Electoral reform 
It also supports the introduction of recall elections, the right to reject and a provision for absentee ballots. The party also supports a directly elected prime minister and directly elected chief ministers for the seven provinces of Nepal.

The party in its manifesto for the 2022 elections also supported the idea of a non-partisan president elected by an expanded electoral college which would incorporate elected representatives from ward chairs to federal lawmakers and also touted the idea of the chairman of the National Assembly acting as the de facto vice-president. The party also seeks to end political appointments in constitutional bodies and has called for the Constitutional Council to be scrapped and for appointments to constitutional bodies be recommended by the National Assembly and confirmed by the House of Representatives instead. The party has also called for the dissolution of provincial assemblies and district co-ordination committees and has stood in favour of a provincial council which would be elected by the heads of local governments in the province and the party chair Rabi Lamichhane did not cast his vote at the 2022 provincial elections.

Economic and social welfare 
The party sees the private sector, co-operatives and the public sector as the three pillars of the economy. The party favors competition and seeks to establish a growing role of  the private sector as an alternative to the public sector in order to deliver services to the people and for economic growth. The party wants to end income tax for people in the lowest octile of earners in the country. The party also seeks to establish food banks in every ward in the country and to guarantee nutrition assistance for people living under the poverty line by issuing them ration cards. The party also seeks to expand the current social welfare system and to include private insurance companies in the social welfare system.

Healthcare 
The party supports the establishment of a single-payer healthcare system and the establishment of at least one laboratory and a 750-bed hospital in each of the seven provinces, a 50 to 100-bed hospital in each of the 77 districts, a 6 to 25-bed hospital in each local unit and a clinic in each ward in the country. The party also wants to establish a centralized national ambulance service, health and quality assurance accreditation board, a food and drug department, a central disease board and a health innovation & development board. The party also wants to create a health workers act for public healthcare workers.

Corruption 
The party seeks to crackdown on corruption by introducing a Whistleblower Protection Act to protect whistleblowers and by establishing an Anti-Corruption Police under the Commission for the Investigation of Abuse of Authority.

Women and sexual minorities 
The party has also called for the establishment of shelters for victims of abuse and the creation of a fund to help victims of human trafficking, domestic violence and acid attack victims. The party also seeks to promote entrepreneurship among women and sexual minorities by establishing funds for businesses where at least sixty percent of the shareholders or employees are female or of a sexual minority group.

Electoral performance

2022 general election
The party nominated 131 candidates for the First Past the Post seats for the 2022 Nepalese general election.

List of Members of Parliament 

The RSP secured a total of 20 seats, 7 FPTP and 13 PR seats, out of the 2022 elections. Following is a list of parliamentarians for the Rastriya Swatantra Party who were elected from the 2022 general elections.

References

Political parties in Nepal
2022 establishments in Nepal
Political parties established in 2022
Rastriya Swatantra Party